Cycadeoidaceae is a family of bennettitalean plants which flourished in the Mesozoic era. Two genera, Cycadeoidea and Monanthesia, are currently recognised though most species are poorly known. They had a similar morphology to cycads, with thick, branchless trunks covered in scale leaves.

References

Bennettitales
Jurassic plants
Cretaceous plants
Prehistoric plant families
Jurassic first appearances
Cretaceous extinctions